Mogod is a sum (district) of Bulgan Province in northern Mongolia. In 2009, its population was 2,738.

References 

Districts of Bulgan Province